PYL Younique Volume 1 is a single album released in October 2012 featuring various SM Town artists. It is the first collaboration project between the auto-mobile manufacturing company Hyundai and the record label agency S.M. Entertainment, both headquartered in Seoul, South Korea.

The single album contains three previously released digital singles "Lookin'" by BoA featuring The Quiett, "My Lifestyle" by Girls' Generation's Jessica Jung featuring Dok2, and the "Maxstep" by Younique Unit which includes Super Junior's Eunhyuk, Girls' Generation's Hyoyeon, Shinee's Taemin, Super Junior-M's Henry, Exo-K's Kai and Exo-M's Lu Han.

PYL

PYL is a Hyundai Motor Company marketing project; meaning Premium Younique Lifestyle. The cars that are associated with it are the Hyundai Veloster, Hyundai i30 and the Hyundai i40.

PYL Younique Volume 1, the collaborative music album created by Hyundai and the record label agency S.M. Entertainment, was released on October 31, 2012.

Track listing

Chart performance

Credits and personnel 
Credits adapted from album's liner notes.

Studio 
 Ingrid Studio – recording, mixing, digital editing 
 SM Yellow Tail Studio – recording, mixing 
 SM Booming System – recording, mixing, digital editing 
 SM Blue Ocean Studio – mixing 
 Sonic Korea – mastering

Personnel 

 SM Entertainment – executive producer
 Lee Soo-man – producer
 BoA – vocals, background vocals 
 Jessica – vocals, background vocals 
 Younique Unit – vocals 
 The Quiett – vocals, lyrics 
 Dok2 – vocals, lyrics 
 Stella Attar – producer , composition, arrangement 
 Will Simms – producer , composition, arrangement 
 Toby Gad – producer , composition, arrangement 
 Marissa Renee Shipp – producer , composition, arrangement 
 Junggigo – lyrics 
 Soulful Monster – lyrics 
 Yoo Young-jin – producer , lyrics, composition, arrangement, background vocals, recording, mixing, digital editing , music and sound supervisor 
 Taesung Kim – vocal directing , recording 
 Kenzie – vocal directing 
 Jung Eun-kyung – recording , digital editing 
 Kim Ji-eun – recording 
 Gu Jong-pil – recording, mixing 
 Lee Seong-ho – mixing 
 Jeon Hoon – mastering

References

External links
 "Maxstep" music video on YouTube

 

SM Entertainment EPs
Korean-language EPs